Excel High School is a public high school in Excel, Alabama. Panthers are the school mascot and black and gold the school colors. It has about 310 students.

The school is located in a rural area and the largest ever graduating class was 79 students. In 1999 it was made a targeted assistance school and provided additional funding resources for additional instructional staff. In 2020 the student body was about 70 percent white and a quarter African American.

History
J. J. Benford was the principal in 1924.

Alumni
Lee Roy Jordan who played football at the University of Alabama as part of Bear Bryant's second recruiting class and in the NFL  for the Dallas Cowboys and coach Tom Landry is an alum. He was inducted into the College Football Hall of Fame after his NFL career wrapped up in 1976. W. C. Majors was his coach at Excel.

References

Education in Monroe County, Alabama
Public high schools in Alabama